"How Long Has This Been Going On?" is a song composed by George Gershwin, with lyrics by Ira Gershwin, for the musical Funny Face in 1927.

History
According to Ira Gershwin in his book Lyrics on Several Occasions, after the premiere of Funny Face in Philadelphia he received a call from the then professional manager of Shapiro, Bernstein and Co. asking him to remove the song because “It doesn't mean anything” and because “Well, we've bought a song with the same title and we're about to publish it. Yours doesn't get you anywhere, so how about taking it out of the show?” Eventually the song was deleted as Ira Gershwin indicates, “Well, he had his wish. A couple of weeks later on the road (either in Atlantic City or Washington) "How Long..." was out, replaced by "He Loves and She Loves"”.

Replaced by "He Loves and She Loves" in Funny Face, it was eventually introduced in the musical Rosalie (1928) by Bobbe Arnst as Mary O'Brien. The lyrics used as first released by Gershwin started with the introductory verse: "As a tot, when I trotted in little velvet panties, / I was kissed by my sisters, my cousins, and my aunties. / Sad to tell, it was hell, an inferno worse than Dante's." In the subsequent version of the lyrics as performed by Ella Fitzgerald ten years later, the lyrics of this introductory verse were changed to the melancholy reflections of a worker in evening "bazaars" reflecting on the differences between kisses for money and romantic kisses from someone with emotional ties, which had previously eluded her. She reflects with "salty tears" about the differences between the two types of kisses.

The introductory verse as performed by Fitzgerald was:
 

In the original Gershwin version of the song, somewhat more upbeat, it is sung by a young woman comparing kisses among family members and friends at holidays, to how different they turn out to be when experienced while expressing romantic affections; she is surprised to find that romantic kisses are very different. The two verses describe her previous negative experiences of kissing: first the childhood attentions of older female relatives, and second while working in a kissing booth. The two choruses describe the excitement of then experiencing a first romantic kiss, and regret at not having experienced it before: "I could cry salty tears; where have I been all these years? / Little wow, tell me now, how long has this been going on?"

Bing Crosby recorded the song in 1955 for use on his radio show and it was subsequently included in the box set The Bing Crosby CBS Radio Recordings (1954-56)'' issued by Mosaic Records (catalog MD7-245) in 2009.

Sources

References 

"How Long Has This Been Going On?" at jazzstandards.com

1927 songs
1920s jazz standards
Songs with music by George Gershwin
Songs with lyrics by Ira Gershwin
Lena Horne songs
Carmen McRae songs
Andy Williams songs
Songs from Funny Face (musical)